Castellino Tanaro is a comune (municipality) in the Province of Cuneo in the Italian region Piedmont, located about  southeast of Turin and about  east of Cuneo.

Castellino Tanaro borders the following municipalities: Ceva, Igliano, Lesegno, Marsaglia, Niella Tanaro, Roascio, and Rocca Cigliè.

Twin towns — sister cities
Castellino Tanaro is twinned with:

  Falicon, France (2004)

References

External links
 Official website

Cities and towns in Piedmont
Comunità Montana Valli Mongia, Cevetta e Langa Cebana